Jennifer Childs-Roshak is an American physician who is president and CEO of Planned Parenthood League of Massachusetts, president of the Planned Parenthood Advocacy Fund of Massachusetts and a board member of the Boston Public Health Commission.  She is the first person with a medical degree to become the chief executive of any Planned Parenthood.

Life and education 
Childs-Roshak grew up in New Hampshire. She attended Harvard University in Cambridge, Massachusetts, and after graduating with a degree in English, moved to New York City to work as an editor for the United Nations Population Fund. While in New York, she began volunteering at a Planned Parenthood facility. She attended medical school at Temple University in Philadelphia. She also has an MBA from the Boston University School of Management.

Childs-Roshak is married to Phillip Roshak. They have two children. She gave birth to her first child while in medical school, and her second while completing her residency at Maine Medical Center Family Practice Center.

Career 
In 1993, Childs-Roshak became a primary care physician with a specialty in family medicine. She worked as a faculty physician at Maine Medical Center Family Practice Center, the same center where she completed her medical school residency. She then became the vice president of family services at the Family Health Center of Worcester. She then moved to become the medical director of quality at the Milford Regional Medical Center. In 2012 she joined Harvard Vanguard's internal medicine department as a physician. She later became the medical director of their facilities in Kenmore, Copley, and Post Office Square, under Atrius Health.

On November 23, 2015, Childs-Roshak became the president and chief executive officer of Planned Parenthood League of Massachusetts, and the president of the Planned Parenthood Advocacy Fund of Massachusetts. She is the first person with a medical degree to lead any Planned Parenthood in the United States, having filled the vacancy left by Marty Walz, who resigned from the position in January 2015.

References 

Physicians from New Hampshire
American women physicians
People associated with Planned Parenthood
Women nonprofit executives
Year of birth uncertain
Place of birth missing (living people)
Living people
Harvard College alumni
Boston University School of Management alumni
Temple University School of Medicine alumni
American women chief executives
American nonprofit chief executives
21st-century American women
Year of birth missing (living people)